The Mixed relay competition at the 2017 World Championships was held on 9 February 2017.

Results
The race was started at 14:45.

References

Mixed relay
Mixed sports competitions